Aik Aur Love Story (Urdu: ایک اور لو اِسٹوری English: One More Love Story) is a Pakistani Urdu language film directed by pop singer Sajjad Ali. It was also the soundtrack to his music album released in 1999.

Music
Music was composed by music director Waqar Ali.
 Aik Aur Love Story (1999)
 Dua Karo
 Jhoole Lal
 Kya Sama Hai
 Lari Adda
 Marina Marina
 Mausam Mein
 Pata Bata Do
 Sohni Lagdi, O' Meinun Sohni Lagdi
 Tum Se Pyar Hai

Awards
 Nigar Award for Best Music Director in 1999 by Waqar Ali.

References

External links

1999 films
Films scored by Sajjad Ali
1990s Urdu-language films
Pakistani musical films
1990s musical films
Nigar Award winners
Urdu-language Pakistani films